What's Happening!! is an American sitcom television series that aired on ABC from August 5, 1976, until April 28, 1979, premiering as a summer series. It returned as a weekly series from November 1976 until its April 1979 conclusion. What's Happening!! was loosely based on the Eric Monte-penned film Cooley High. From 1985 until 1988, a sequel series titled What's Happening Now!! aired in first-run syndication, with most of the major cast members reprising their roles.

What's Happening!! was Bud Yorkin's second series after he ended his partnership with Norman Lear and Tandem Productions. The show was produced by TOY Productions, which was formed by Yorkin, Saul Turteltaub, and Bernie Orenstein after their split.

Premise
What's Happening!! follows the lives of three working-class African-American teens living in the Los Angeles neighborhood of Watts. The show stars Ernest Thomas as Roger "Raj" Thomas, Haywood Nelson as Dwayne Nelson, and Fred Berry as Freddy "Rerun" Stubbs. Additional co-stars include: Danielle Spencer as Roger's younger sister Dee; Mabel King as Roger and Dee's mother Mabel; and Shirley Hemphill as Shirley Wilson, a waitress at Rob's Place, the neighborhood restaurant where the boys are regular patrons. Recurring characters include Rob (Earl Billings), owner of Rob's Place, and Mrs. Collins (Fritzi Burr), a sarcastic history teacher and the sponsor of the school newspaper.

Characters

Principal cast
Roger "Raj" Thomas (Ernest Thomas), the show's protagonist, is a teenager living in Watts with his divorced mother Mabel and his younger sister Dee. Raj is an intelligent, well-mannered young man who sports large black horn-rimmed glasses and aspires to be a writer. Many episodes involve Raj taking steps to pursue his dream, from saving up for a screenwriting course or a typewriter to trying to impress a TV producer. Eventually, he graduates from high school, moves out, and goes to college. Raj is known for his slender build, high-pitched laugh, and bizarre style of dancing. For example, one move involves repeatedly placing his chin upon his fist, like "The Thinker," to the beat of the music. He sometimes tries to impress older women by talking in a baritone voice. Raj also mumbles when there is something that he does not wish to say, but knows he must, especially if it is bad news.

Dwayne Clemens Nelson (Haywood Nelson) is the youngest member of the trio. Dwayne has an unassuming, good-natured demeanor and suffers from debilitating shyness and an acute fear of the dark. Dwayne's storylines often deal with his problems with girls, bullies, and his uncertain future. Dwayne is known for his greeting, "Hey, hey, hey!" and for saying "nuh-uh!" when he denies or refuses something. Dwayne is the only character who appears in every episode of What's Happening!!

Frederick (Freddy) "Rerun" Stubbs (Fred Berry) is a bumbling, comedic young man with a friendly personality, commonly seen wearing a red beret and various suspenders. He is often teased by his friends for being overweight and unintelligent. He is nicknamed "Rerun" because, due to his failing grades in school, "every summer he has to go to school to rerun the stuff he did all winter." However, Rerun is an energetic and talented dancer who enters a dance contest and The Gong Show, auditions for a dance troupe, and tries to get on a TV commercial. In the third season, Rerun shares an apartment with Raj and works as a page for ABC.

Dee Thomas (Danielle Spencer) is Raj's younger sibling. In the show's first season, she is irksome and rude, and says things that are well beyond her years. She is shrewd and obsessed with making money, usually by blackmailing her brother and his friends a quarter at a time. As the series progressed and Dee grew older, her caustic personality mellowed into a sly sense of sarcasm, which included continuous insults of Rerun based on his weight and his stupidity, and she became more likable and clashed less with Raj. After Raj moved into an apartment in the third season, Dee remained in the Thomas house, with Shirley moving in to help out. Her trademark phrase is "Ooooohh, I'm tellin' Mama!" or "Ooooohh, you're going to get it!" when she witnesses or hears about a wrongdoing, especially by her brother. Her favorite food is peanut butter. Her birthday is September 17.

Mabel Thomas (Mabel King) is Raj and Dee's divorced mother. She is typically the voice of wisdom and authority, and a parental figure for Dwayne and Rerun, who approach her for advice as well. Mabel's ex-husband Bill (Thalmus Rasulala) drifts in and out of her life during the first season, but appears in the second season when he gets remarried to his steady girlfriend in the Thomas household. Her role became less important in later episodes, and eventually she disappeared from the show altogether, although her character was never written out and was still referred to. Her trademark phrase is "This is true," when agreeing with a statement someone makes. Reportedly, King left the show due to a disagreement over the direction the series was going.

Shirley Wilson (Shirley Hemphill) is a waitress at the neighborhood soda shop, Rob's Place, where the main characters are regular patrons. She is a brash person who likes to take shots at the boys and often clashes with Rerun as they are both overweight. Some episodes turn the spotlight briefly on Shirley and her joys and sorrows. Shirley moves into the Thomas residence in the last season to be a guardian to Dee after Raj moves out and Mrs. Thomas leaves to tend to a sick relative.

Recurring characters
Bill Thomas (Thalmus Rasulala) is Mabel's ex-husband and the father of Roger and Dee. He abandoned his family when Dee was one month old and became a shady character. When he first appears, he tries to con Mabel out of money. However, in later episodes, he is depicted in a more positive light. After his on-screen marriage to Lee Henderson (Lee Chamberlin), Bill was never seen again on the show, although he continued to be mentioned off-screen. On the follow-up series What's Happening Now!!, Rasulala guest-starred in the second-season premiere episode, "Nadine's Surprise." In that episode, it was explained that Bill and Roger had been estranged since he had remarried, and Roger's wife Nadine planned a surprise reunion for Bill and Roger to make amends.

Gene "Rabbit" Walker (Ray Vitte) is a political science major at the University of Southern California, and a track team member. He appears in two first-season episodes as a boarder at the Thomas home, renting Dee's bedroom. In his first appearance, he is referred to and credited as "Dean." Gene took a liking to Dee, giving her the nickname "Small Portion." In another episode, his character is mentioned as being away, so Mrs. Thomas offers his room to Dee's ex-con pen pal.

Detective "Big Earl" Barnett (John Welsh) is a police detective who lives in the apartment building where Raj and Rerun move into in the third season. He is involved in undercover and stakeout operations that sometimes require him to wear ridiculous disguises.

"Little Earl" Barnett (David Hollander) is Big Earl's son. He has a crush on Dee, who is about five years his senior. This is indicated by Little Earl addressing Dee with different terms of endearment. Although Dee politely returns Little Earl's greetings, she ignores his crush on her.

Rob (Earl Billings) is the owner of Rob's Place and Shirley's boss. A small business owner trying to make his business survive, Rob is known for serving low-quality, poor-tasting fast food (often made up of the previous day's left-overs or "kitchen accidents," such as a "meatloaf milkshake") to save money and make ends meet. Nevertheless, he has a steady business of high school-age customers who use the restaurant as an after-school hangout.

Terry "Snake" Simpson (Leland Smith) is a star college basketball player whom Roger tutors in the third season. He eventually became friends with Roger, Dwayne, and Rerun.

Mrs. Gertrude Collins (Fritzi Burr) is the boys' high school teacher. She admires Roger, and wishes the best for him as a promising student (although the two once clashed over material to print in the school newspaper), but she is frequently frustrated with Rerun, whom she has had as a student many, many times due to his constant failures.

Marvin (Bryan O'Dell) is the boys' high school classmate. He is a reporter for the school paper, always looking for a new story, and is sometimes seen at Rob's Place.

Leon (Henry Robinson III) is a martial arts enthusiast with a Bruce Lee style haircut, and has made two appearances: as Rob's customer in "Shirley's a Mother," and as a bully who bets on Rerun's disco-dancing abilities in "Disco Dollar Disaster."

Diane Harris (Debbi Morgan) is another classmate of Roger, Dwayne, and Rerun. In the first two seasons, she was frequently seen in the classroom or at Rob's Place, and at a birthday party for Roger. (In the pilot episode, she was referred to as Diane Stewart.)

Larry Nelson (Greg Morris) is Dwayne's father, a local city councilman and career politician.

Notable guest stars
The Doobie Brothers appeared as themselves to perform a concert at Jefferson High (which was portrayed as the Doobies' alma mater). Band member Patrick Simmons told Rerun he remembered him from one of his old classes, saying "Glad you came back," to which Rerun responded, "Came back? I'm still here!"
Actor Theodore Wilson made three appearances on What's Happening!! as three different characters: in the pilot episode as the father of a girl who hosts a house party, as a co-worker of Mabel's employer and as bootlegging criminal Al Dunbar, who forced Rerun to illegally record the Doobie Brothers' concert.
Actress Chip Fields appeared on What's Happening!! as two different characters: Shirley's pregnant sister Norma and Rerun's sister Donna, with whom Rerun had lived (along with Donna's husband Ike) before moving in with Raj.
The dance group the Lockers appeared in the first season as a group called the Rockets for whom Rerun auditions. (Fred Berry was an original member of the Lockers.) Wolfman Jack also made an appearance in this episode.
Sorrell Booke, Hazzard County's corrupt commissioner Boss Hogg from The Dukes of Hazzard, appeared as a college-basketball booster who tries to manipulate Snake in the third-season episode "Basketball Brain".
Actor Tim Reid appeared as Dr. Claymore in the episode "It's All in Your Head".
Future Academy Award and Grammy Award winner Irene Cara appeared as Rerun's would-be immigrant bride Maria in the episode "Rerun Gets Married".
Musician and actor Slim Gaillard appeared as Al in the episode "The Thomas Treasure".
Noted jazz singer, Bill Henderson, appeared in season 2, episode 3, "Trial and Error", as Clarence Hopkins, the philandering driver of the Cadillac involved in a traffic accident with Raj.

Series changes

During the second season, using the show's first-season success as leverage, Fred Berry demanded a higher salary and better studio accommodations for the actors. The accommodations issue eventually led to a full-fledged walkout by Berry and Thomas during the second-season episode "If I'm Elected" (leaving Haywood Nelson to carry the entire episode, with Shirley Hemphill stepping to the forefront, along with Bryan O'Dell and Debbi Morgan in featured speaking parts). Producer Bud Yorkin, in turn, suspended the pair, forcing them to sign $25,000 promissory notes to return to the show and guard against further walkouts. The dispute was quickly settled, and both returned for the following episode.

In addition, Mabel King had a much-reduced role in the series during the second season, largely due to creative differences with the producers (she wanted the Roger and Dee characters to have married parents, rather than divorced). Her character, Mama, was not written out of the show but rather limited to brief appearances on set (where she would say she was "leaving for work" or "going to the store") or mentioned in passing by other characters as being "at work."

The show changed significantly in the third season, with Raj and Rerun graduating high school (Rerun after seven years), with the two moving into their own apartment near the University of Southern California. Mabel King finally left the show (her character moved to Phoenix, Arizona to tend to a sick relative), and Shirley moved into the Thomas household as a boarder and Dee's guardian. Also, several new recurring characters were introduced. The first was a basketball player whom Roger tutored and nicknamed "The Snake" (played by Leland Smith). The other characters were white detective "Big Earl" Barnett (played by John Welsh) and his son "Little Earl" Barnett (played by David Hollander), who were neighbors in the apartment building where Roger and Rerun lived.

What became the role of "Little Earl" was initially created to be filled by ten-year-old Gary Coleman at the suggestion of ABC President Fred Silverman. Silverman was a huge proponent of Coleman and, feeling that breakout stardom was around the corner for the young talent, wanted him added to the show.  When Silverman left ABC in 1978 to head rival network NBC, he had Diff'rent Strokes created for Coleman, which ran for eight years, and was highly rated.

Cancellation
During the third season (1978–79), Berry again threatened to strike (not appearing in the third-season episode "Dee, the Cheerleader"). Thomas joined Berry in the strike threat, which led to a heated meeting with the executive producers, culminating with Berry making accusations of racism. In light of the seriousness of the accusation, and now unmotivated (and unwilling) to accommodate the stars, the producers opted to cancel the moderately successful series.

What's Happening!! aired its last episode on April 28, 1979. A year later, Hemphill starred in her own sitcom, One In A Million, which premiered in January 1980 and ended on July 23, 1980, after being on ABC for a few months.

Ratings
What's Happening!! was a modest ratings success.

Success and What's Happening Now!!

The show was a modest success in its network run, despite some serious production problems, and repeats of the show's 65 episodes did reasonably well in syndication. In some markets, the show was perceived to appeal to both children and adults in a similar way to The Brady Bunch and Happy Days. The show was often aired in transitional hours where stations would change their after-school programming lineup from cartoons to evening sitcoms in the 1980s.  In a few markets the show actually had higher ratings in syndication than during the network run. With this success in mind, a revival of the show was produced entitled What's Happening Now!!  It ran from 1985 to 1988 in first-run syndication.

Home media
Sony Pictures Home Entertainment has released all three seasons of What's Happening!!

On August 27, 2013, it was announced that Mill Creek Entertainment had acquired the rights to various television series from the Sony Pictures library including What's Happening!! On September 2, 2014, they re-released the first two seasons on DVD.

On April 21, 2015, Mill Creek released a budget-priced complete series set, a 6-disc set featuring all 65 episodes.

Episodes

Syndication
The show was syndicated on many local channels (with all 66 episodes of sequel series What's Happening Now!! joining the syndication package in the fall of 1988 to total 131 episodes) and continued in an on-again, off-again manner until 2009.

BET reran both series from September 20, 1993, to October 27, 1995.

TV Land reran the show during the 2005–2006 season.

As of March 1, 2013, cable network TV One shows reruns of What's Happening!!

On December 2, 2013, the newly rebranded Encore Black channel started airing What's Happening!!

Starting January 2, 2017, the digital broadcast network Antenna TV began airing the original series.

References

External links

 
 TVParty.com's three part series on What's Happening!!:
 What happened to What's Happening!!?
 What's Happening!! soars to the top, then a deadly car crash, walkouts, drugs and death...
 The show is revived, Rerun quits (again) and three cast members die...

1976 American television series debuts
1979 American television series endings
1970s American black sitcoms
1970s American sitcoms
American Broadcasting Company original programming
American teen sitcoms
English-language television shows
Television series about families
Television series by Sony Pictures Television
Television shows set in Los Angeles
Live action television shows based on films
Mass media portrayals of the working class